Pomaderris cinerea is a species of flowering plant in the family Rhamnaceae and is endemic to south-eastern New South Wales. It is a shrub or small tree with hairy branches, elliptic to egg-shaped with the narrower end towards the base, and panicles of pale yellow flowers.

Description
The flowers are borne in narrow panicles and lack petals. Flowering occurs in summer and the fruit is a hairy capsule.

Taxonomy
Pomaderris cinerea was first formally described in 1863 by George Bentham in Flora Australiensis from specimens collected by Ferdinand von Mueller on Mount Imlay and at Twofold Bay. The specific epithet (cinerea) means "ash-covered or grey".

Distribution and habitat
This pomaderris grows in forest or near rainforest on near-coastal ranges from near Moruya to Bega in the far south-east of New South Wales.

References

Flora of New South Wales
cinerea
Taxa named by George Bentham
Plants described in 1863